Shokeda is a religious moshav in southern Israel. Located approximately six kilometres west of Netivot and covering 6,000 dunams, it falls under the jurisdiction of Sdot Negev Regional Council.

History
The village was established in 1957 by the Jewish Agency for Moroccan Jewish immigrants. They arrived in two groups, and the original aim was to found two settlements; Shokeda and Tzumha. However, only one of them was established.

In the late winter months, Shokeda becomes a tourist attraction due to the multitude of wild red poppy flowers that carpet the landscape.

See also
Wildlife of Israel

References

External links
 Shokeda Eco-Farm

Moshavim
Religious Israeli communities
Populated places established in 1957
Gaza envelope
Populated places in Southern District (Israel)
1957 establishments in Israel
Moroccan-Jewish culture in Israel